Frederick Calvert may refer to:

 Frederick Calvert, 6th Baron Baltimore (1731–1771), English nobleman
 Frederick Crace Calvert (1819–1873), English chemist
 Frederick Calvert (MP) (1806–1891), Member of Parliament for Aylesbury, 1850–1851
 Frederick Calvert (footballer), football player
 Frederick Baltimore Calvert (1793–1877), English actor and lecturer on elocution